{{Infobox school
| name=Futures Academy '(Integrating with Fusion Academy).
| image=
| motto=School Reimagined
| streetaddress=
| city=
| state=California
| country= U.S.
| zipcode=
| fundingtype=Private
| schooltype= Middle School and High School
| religious_affiliation= Non-sectarian
| patron=
| established=1985
| chairman_of_the_board=
| president=
| principal=
| rector=
| viceprincipal=
| grades=6-12
| products= Middle School and High School taught in classrooms with a 1 student to 1 teacher ratio as well as small group courses.
| colors= Blue, Orange, Yellow
| information=866-980-7248
| website=
| campuses=17
}}Futures Academy''' is a WASC-accredited, UC, CSU & NCAA-approved California private middle school and high school offering 1:1 instruction and flexible scheduling options. Futures Academy has campus locations in Anaheim Hills, Beverly Hills, Brentwood, Carlsbad, Cupertino, Huntington Beach, Manhattan Beach, Mission Viejo/Laguna Hills, Newport Beach, Pasadena, Pleasanton, San Mateo, San Diego, Walnut Creek, Westlake Village, and Woodland Hills.

About 
Futures Academy updated its name from Halstrom Academy in 2018 to better align with its innovative teaching approach. Futures Academy offers open enrollment, flexible scheduling, 1:1 class sizes, and part-time and full-time programs for all students including aspiring athletes and artists, working students, unique learners (ADD/ADHD, IEPs), and those needing to remediate course work. Since 1985, Futures Academy has taught more than 19,000 students in grades 6-12. In 2022, Futures Academy will be merging with Fusion Academy. 

Futures Academy campuses are designed to inspire learning. As a network of schools, they have incorporated the latest findings in design and learning theory to create spaces that spark creativity and learning. The school colors are rooted in color psychology and denote energy, enthusiasm, hope, optimism, and stability. Futures Academy embodies a campus culture is welcoming, warm, and authentic. The middle school and high school utilizes updated technology for educational purposes and offers the ability to use either electronic or traditional resources, such as textbooks.

As of 2022, Futures Academy has merged into Fusion Academy. Many Futures campuses will be rebranding.

Courses 
Futures Academy offers over 170 courses including 32 honors and 16 AP courses, along with college prep, general and workshop-level courses in English, practical arts, fine arts, math, foreign language, science, social science, test prep, and personal development. Specialty courses such as the Science of Happiness and Mindshift are offered and over 70 21st century skill courses enabling students to explore career options in coding, STEAM, digital arts, and storytelling.

Notable alumni 

Sasha Cohen - Olympics silver medalist figure skater
Blake Lively, actress
Ryan Sheckler
Josie Totah, actress
Andy Zhang, golfer

References

External links 
 Futures Academy

High schools in Orange County, California
High schools in San Diego County, California
High schools in Los Angeles County, California
Private high schools in California
Private middle schools in California
Alternative schools in California
1985 establishments in California